Hjulsta is a working-class suburb of Stockholm. It is considered being part of Tensta, but with its own subway station which was opened in 1975 and is the end station of the blue line.

The modern urban area of Hjulsta took its name from an old village known to have been located in the area at least from the 1480s. 

The station's artwork is created by several artists, among them Sjöfåglar by Christina Rundqvist-Andersson, Sista skörden i norra Botkyrka by Olle Magnusson and Landbyska verken vid Engelbrektsplan år 1890 by Ruth Rydfeldt.

See also
Hjulsta metro station

Metropolitan Stockholm